The prohibition of Kohen defilement to the dead is the commandment to a Jewish priest (kohen) not to come in direct contact with, or be in the same enclosed roofed space as a dead human body.

Hebrew Bible 
The command forbidding the priest from defilement by contact with a dead body is stated in the Book of Leviticus;

Rabbinical application 
Although the priest, or modern kohen, is forbidden to come in contact with a dead body, he is permitted to become defiled for his closest relatives: father, mother, brother, unmarried sister, and child. Defilement of a Kohen to his wife, although implied in the Torah text as forbidden according to Maimonides and Ibn Ezra on Leviticus 21:3-4, is permitted by rabbinical order.

Enclosures 

A Kohen is forbidden to enter any house or enclosure ("ohel", tent) in which a dead body (or part thereof), may be found. Practical examples of these prohibitions include: not entering a cemetery or attending a funeral; not being under the same roof (i.e. in a home or hospital) as a dismembered organ.

The rules and regulations of defilement are discussed at length in the Mishnah Tohorot. A cursory rule of thumb is that the kohen may not enter a room with a dead person.

Cemeteries 
Rabbinic prohibition further limits the Kohen of coming within four amoth of an outdoor (i.e. no roof or overhang present) corpse or grave, but a fence or groove with a height or depth of 10 tefachim eases the restriction and enables the Kohen to be within four tefachim of the corpse or grave.

In order to protect the Kohen from coming into prohibited contact with or proximity to the dead, Orthodox cemeteries traditionally designate a burial ground for Kohanim and their families which is at a distance from the general burial ground, so that the relatives of Kohanim can be visited by a Kohen without him entering the cemetery.

A non-Jew 
There is a Tannaic dispute as to whether the prohibition of defilement is applicable to the corpse of a non-Jew. Rabbi Shimon bar Yochai opines that the prohibition does not apply while others maintain that it does.

Exceptions

Meit mitzvah, commandment of burying 
The Talmud prescribes that if a priest, even the High Priest, chances upon a corpse by the wayside, and there is no one else in the area who can be called upon to bury it, then the priest himself must forgo the requirement to abstain from defilement and perform the burial of this person (a meit mitzvah).

Death of a nasi 

The Talmud Yerushalmi and Talmud Bavli quote an instance where the restriction of a kohen to defile himself to a corpse was ostensibly waived. In the case of the death of a nasi (top rabbinic leader of a religious academy). The Talmud relates that when Judah haNasi died, the priestly laws forbidding defilement through contact with the dead were temporarily suspended, for the specific purpose of making possible full participation of his burial ceremony.

However, there is a dispute among the commentators of the Talmud over whether the severe biblical prohibition itself was suspended. Some indeed maintain so, yet others explain that the prohibition waived was only a lesser prohibition regarding 'beit hapras', (a field in which there is a lost and unmarked grave).

The special permission granted to kohanim, according to some Talmud commentators, to defile themselves for the sake of a deceased rabbi, applied only to a deceased nasi, or - arguably - supreme rabbinic leaders of a status similar to that of a nasi, and even in that case - only for the very day of the funeral. The special permission did not apply to other rabbis or  tzaddikim (righteous rabbinic leaders). It is recorded that some renowned tzaddikim deliberately expressed to those present at the time of their imminent passing that those kohens (or pure vessels) present should make an immediate exit (be removed from the premises) so as not to become 'tammei (defiled). These leaders include the popular nasi Yochanan ben Zakai (Talmud Yerushalmi to Avodah Zarah 18a) and also Isaac Luria.

Prohibition reasons 
Since the Kohanim serve a unique role of service amongst the nation of Israel, service in the Temple in Jerusalem during the temple era and consumption of heave offerings, the Torah requires them to follow unique rules of ritual purity. Generally, the prohibition of the Kohen becoming impure (tammei) by contact with a corpse is considered in full effect in modern times and is maintained in Orthodox Judaism.

Rabbi Menachem Mendel Schneerson describes the restriction of the Kohen defiling himself by contact with a corpse due to a corpse being a contradiction to godliness (God is understood as the source of vitality and life), which negates the designation of a Kohen who is to maintain a holy state in his service to God - even in the diaspora. Schneerson maintains that the corpse can cause metaphysical interference to the Kohen's spiritual abilities.

Modern applications 
Orthodox Jewry maintains that the modern-day Kohen is obligated to guard himself from defilement to a corpse, leading to restrictions that the modern Kohen needs to consider when met with common occurrences of the Jewish life cycle.

Hospitals 
Kohanim are required not to be in a hospital where a dead body or body parts may be present. The wife of a Kohen giving birth presents a challenge to the Kohen wanting to be present at the delivery. A hetter (rabbinic permit) is generally given by a rabbi for a one time entry for the Kohen to be present at his wife's delivery.

However, hospital entry poses additional concerns as Halakha stipulates that an infant or juvenile kohen is likewise forbidden from becoming unclean by contact with a corpse, while the adult is to be scrupulous that the juvenile or infant kohen do not accidentally transgress. This responsibility leads to many kohanim choosing a birthing center or a hospital with the maternity ward in a separate building than where the hospital morgue is located so as to not make their newborn son ritually unclean.

Hospitals with special arrangements to facilitate entry of kohanim include:

Airlines 
Kohanim are careful to avoid boarding an airplane that is also carrying a dead body or body parts. The modern Kohen is challenged by US airline regulations permitting corpses and body parts to be boarded up to 90 minutes prior to flight departure.

Leniency dynamics 
With the prohibition of Kohen defilement often posing challenges to the Kohen, leniency is often sought in the form of a rabbinic hetter (permit) for the Kohen to become unclean. One primary source of lenient application focuses on the beraita of Evel Rabbati (Semachot);

References

External links 
 Defilement prohibitions of the kohen – kehuna.org

Negative Mitzvoth
Priesthood (Judaism)
Judaism and death
Jewish ritual purity law